Dilger is a surname. Notable people with the surname include:

 Anton Dilger (1884–1918), German-American physician
 Hubert Dilger (1836–1911), decorated German immigrant in the Union Army during the American Civil War
 Ken Dilger (born 1971), retired American football player
 Max Dilger (born 1989), German Speedway racer
 Mike Dilger (born 1966), British ecologist and natural history presenter
 Michael Dilger (born 1994), American entrepreneur and designer